National Highway 251, commonly called NH 251 is a national highway in  India. It is a spur road of National Highway 51. NH-251 traverses the state of Gujarat and the union territory of Dadra and Nagar Haveli and Daman and Diu in India.

Route 
Gujarat 
Una
Dadra and Nagar Haveli and Daman and Diu
Ghoghla, Diu
Gujarat
Kesaria

Junctions  
  Terminal near Una.
  Terminal near Kesaria.

See also 

 List of National Highways in India
 List of National Highways in India by state

References

External links 

 on OpenStreetMap

National Highways in Gujarat
National Highways in Dadra and Nagar Haveli and Daman and Diu